The 1987 Calgary Stampeders finished in 3rd place in the West Division with a 10–8 record. They were defeated in the West Semi-Final by the Edmonton Eskimos.

Offseason

CFL draft

Roster

Preseason

Regular season

Season Standings

Season schedule

Awards and records

1987 CFL All-Stars

Western All-Star Selections

Playoffs

West Semi-Final

References

Calgary Stampeders seasons
1987 Canadian Football League season by team